Woodland Baptist Church is a historic church at 885 Woodland Church Road at Woodland in rural Haywood County, Tennessee.  It was built in c. 1920 and added to the National Register in 2003.

It is unusual as an Akron plan church in rural Tennessee.

References

Baptist churches in Tennessee
Churches on the National Register of Historic Places in Tennessee
Churches completed in 1920
Churches in Haywood County, Tennessee
National Register of Historic Places in Haywood County, Tennessee